Diocese of Hpa-an may refer to:

the Anglican Diocese of Hpa-an (Church of the Province of Myanmar)
the Roman Catholic Diocese of Hpa-an